Lycée Charles de Gaulle is a French international school in Damascus, Syria. The school serves the levels maternelle (preschool) through lycée (senior high school).

Despite the Syrian Civil War, as of 2015 the school has remained open.

During its first years, the school was only designed for French students. Later on, it became more accessible by other nationalities but still the majority of the students were French. When the civil war started there was no more connection between Syria and France for political reasons. The school got directed by the parents of the students that made it accessible by everyone. No more employees are sent from France, only local contracts and French students became a minority. Today, it's a private school like many others with 77% of it Syrians, 13% French and 10% other nationalities (Argentinians, Armenians, Lebanese,).

There are more students in high school than in primary school.

The inscriptions:

Before the civil war, the school had around 1000 students including 566 just in primary section in 2007. The civil war provoked the departure of the majority.

The evolution in high school since 2003:

The school has only 375 students during the 2017–2018 school year.

Those last years (2018-2019), the situation got better slowly and the conditions became more acceptable, this led a short while later the augmentation of 19.2 % of the inscriptions and the kindergarten and primary sectors got influenced the most, this is explained by the willingness of parents to adapt their kids to the French system from their youngest age.

The primary and high school sectors even today:

Results:

Despite the critical conditions that the students went through, the results proved the efficiency of the system and surpasses the average grades of the AEFE as well as some cases in France.

Sources :

Administrative archives

See also
 Lycée Français d'Alep (school in Aleppo)

References

External links
  Lycée Charles de Gaulle

Damascus
Schools in Damascus